Super Bunny is a platform game written by Vic Leone for the Apple II family of home computers and published by Datamost in 1983. Ports to the Atari 8-bit family and Commodore 64 followed in 1984.

Gameplay

The player starts as a defenseless rabbit, hopping from the left side of the screen to the right on scrolling platforms. The goal is to avoid the creatures that appear on the platforms and reach the carrot at the right side of the screen. Landing on ("eating") the carrot turns the rabbit into Super Bunny, at which point he must return to the starting position, dispatching creatures and earning points.

The game has a different saying and song for each level (e.g., "crunch those critters" and the song "Here Comes Peter Cottontail!"). Super Bunny is credited in the game's splash screen as Reginald Rabbit.

Credits
 Programmer: Vic Leone
 Game concept: Bill Russell
 Super Bunny concept: Gary Koffler
 Graphics: Thomas Spears
 Executive producer: Dave Gordon
 Story: Dale Kranz
 Music: Jon Rami and Dale Kranz
 Cover art and illustrations: Martin Cannon
 Cover copy: Dale Kranz
 Art Director: Art Huff

References

External links

1983 video games
Apple II games
Atari 8-bit family games
Commodore 64 games
Datamost games
Platform games
Video games about rabbits and hares
Video games developed in the United States
Single-player video games